Filippo Agricola (1776–1857) was an Italian painter of the 19th century, mainly active in Rome.

He was born at Urbino but trained in the Accademia di San Luca in Rome. He became that institution's president in 1843. He also became director of the mosaic factory of the Vatican. He worked mainly in Rome, painting for the churches of  San Onofrio, San Giovanni in Laterano, and San Paolo fuori le Mura. He died during the time he was at work in the latter. He painted the portraits of the Crown Princess of Denmark (1822), and of the Countess Costanza Monti Perticari now found in the Galleria Nazionale d'arte Moderna in Rome.  Agricola also painted a portrait of Lt General Sir Gordon Drummond while Drummond was convalescing in Rome from a gunshot wound received in the War of 1812.

References

1776 births
1857 deaths
People from Urbino
18th-century Italian painters
Italian male painters
19th-century Italian painters
19th-century Italian male artists
18th-century Italian male artists